Andliga sånger is the debut studio album by Swedish singer Christer Sjögren.

Track listing
Pärleporten
Crying in the Chapel
Barnatro
Han är min sång och min glädje (There Goes My Everything)
Gyllne morgon
Jag har hört om en stad
Räck mig din hand
När du går över floden
Guldgrävarsången
O store Gud
Ovan där (We Will Understand it Better by and by)
Var jag går i skogar, berg och dalar
O sällhet stor

Personnel 

 Christer Sjögren – lead vocals

Charts

References 

1989 debut albums
1989 albums
Christer Sjögren albums